The 1963 Ballon d'Or, given to the best football player in Europe as judged by a panel of sports journalists from UEFA member countries, was awarded to Lev Yashin, the first, and as of February 2023, the only goalkeeper to win this award. He also became the first Soviet and Russian national to win the award.

Rankings

References

1963
1963–64 in European football